Brian C. O'Regan is an American chemist known for the co-invention of dye-sensitized solar cells (DSSC, DSC, SSC). He was previously  a Research Lecturer at Imperial College London where he conducted research on photovoltaic cells and other applications of nano-structured oxide electronic materials.

Major scientific contributions

Brian O'Regan is known for his pioneering work on the deposition of meso-porous oxides from colloidal solutions that ultimately led to the first high efficiency DSSC. He has also developed the first high efficiency non-aqueous electrolyte for DSSC and more recently has overturned the belief that water is poisonous to dye sensitisation by designing water based and water tolerant DSSC.
He has invented TiO2 electrodeposition from TiCl3, electrodeposition of CuSCB and non-aqueous electrodeposition of aligned mesoporous ZnO. He holds 5 patents and is the author of numerous research papers.

References

External links
 Brian O'Regan's account of the invention of DSSC can be found here

21st-century American chemists
Year of birth missing (living people)
Living people
University of California, Berkeley alumni
University of Washington alumni